Francis Nicholls may refer to:

 Frankie Knuckles (1955–2014), American DJ and record producer
 Francis T. Nicholls (1834–1912), two-term Governor of Louisiana

See also
 Francis D. Nichol (1897–1966), Seventh-day Adventist
 Francis Nicolls (disambiguation), including Francis Nichols
 Francis Nicholson (disambiguation)